Walter Duddins (20 May 1903 – 1945) was a German Communist Party activist and politician.

Life

Provenance and early years 
Walter Duddins was born at Königsberg in East Prussia.  He was only 6 when his father, a teacher died.  After 1909 he was brought up  by foster parents.   On leaving school he undertook an apprenticeship as a machinist and used his qualification to work in Königsberg, then relocating at some stage (possibly during 1922) to Dortmund, which meant moving from the extreme eastern side of Germany to the extreme west.   The Ruhr region, with Dortmund at its heart, was politically very important, in part because it was still one of the country’s largest and most dynamic industrial regions.

Young communist 
Duddins was still only 14 in 1917, the year in which he linked up with the Socialist Youth Movement   The next year he joined the so-called Spartacus League, founded in 1914 by activist members of the Social Democratic Party (SPD) who had been appalled by the failure of the SPD parliamentary leadership to oppose the launch of the war and their subsequent decision to support funding of the war  with the party’s parliamentary votes.   Despite having been regarded as a minority niche band of anti-militarist eccentrics in 1914, by 1918 the slaughter of war and the desperate austerity inflicted on the home front, had led to increasing support for the Spartacus League between 1916 and 1918: at a congress held in Berlin  between 30 December 1918 and 2 January 1919 the Spartacists provided the leadership for the founding of the Communist Party of Germany.   Within less than a month the party’s two most high-profile leaders had been murdered.   The Communist Party, drawing encouragement from popular perceptions of the so-called October Revolution  in Petrograd, flourished, however.    Walter Duddins was a founder member.    Between 1918 and 1922 he worked as a party youth official in East Prussia.   He also served during 1921/22 as a member of the party leadership team ("Bezirksleitung") for the region.

In 1922, now aged 19 Duddins was appointed regional youth secretary for the Ruhr region.   In 1923 he was expelled from the party for “alleged [unspecified] irregularities”, however.   This also meant the loss of his job within the party’s national organisation structure.   At a period of intense internal  fractional wrangling over the soul and the future of the recently launched Communist Party, this was not an unusual experience for Communist Party activists.   He was subsequently rehabilitated.
Between 1925 and 1933 Walter Duddins lived in Dortmund and (between 1930 and 1932) in Erfurt with Johanna Melzer (1904-1960), who would be commended by admirers  after 1945 for having avoided betraying comrades under torture during the Hitler year, despite spending more than ten of those years in a series of prisons.   Walter Duddins  is believed to have died in a Soviet labour camp in 1945.

Party promotions and prison 
In January 1926, following his “rehabilitation” by the party leadership, Duddins was appointed Party Secretary for the Duisburg sub-region.   He then served, between 1927 and 1929, as Party Secretary for the Bochum region.   Although his personal convictions drew him towards comrades such as Kurt Landau and Anton Grylewicz of the party’s ”Trotskyite” left-wing opposition faction, when the inevitable split occurred, he remained loyal to the Stalinist party line represented by the German party leadership under Ernst Thälmann.   In 1927 Duddins was sentenced to six months in prison for “Widerstand gegen die Staatsgewalt” (‘’loosely, ”resisting state authority”’’).   A year later, in March 1928, he was sentenced to an eighteen month period if detention in a low-security "fortress prison" following conviction under a charge of “Zersetzung der Schutzpolizei” (‘’loosely, “degrading the regional security police”’’).

Parliamentarian 
In May 1928 Duddins was elected to membership of the Prussian Landtag (state parliament), representing the Communist Party in the “Westphalia-South” electoral district, for which he was the third candidate on the party list.   He was re-elected in 1932, this time for the Erfurt electoral district.   He continued to serve as a member of the Prussian parliament till the abolition of democracy during 1933).   He also worked as regional party secretary for the Dortmund sub-region from 1930.   Shortly after taking on the Dortmund party secretaryship, as the polarisation of politics spilled onto German streets in the backwash from the Wall Street crash, Duddins was subject to an assassination attempt by Ernst Röhm’s Nazi paramilitaries.   Notwithstanding the failure of the attempt to kill him, by the end of 1930 he had relocated to Erfurt, serving between 1930 and 1932 as “Polleiter” (loosely, "Head of Party Policy") for the Thüringen district.

Régime change 
In January 1933, shrewdly exploiting parliamentary deadlock in the national Reichstag (parliament), Hitler’s National Socialist Party took power and the country was rapidly transformed into a one-party dictatorship.   Political opposition activism became illegal, with well-documented Communist politicians among the first to be targeted by the security services for persecution or elimination.   Many of the top party officials were arrested or fled abroad, heading for Prague, Paris or Moscow.  Others stayed behind, determined to continue their political work even if it meant living “underground” – avoiding registration with any local cist hall, and relocating frequently to keep a step ahead of the security services.   Duddins was one of those she stayed in Germany  He was sent to the “Wasserkante” region surrounding Hamburg  to organise “illegal work” on behalf of the party.

Arrest and detention 
Six months after the Hitler take-over, the authorities caught up  with him and Duddins was arrested during July 1933.   He appears to have spent slightly more than a year in pretrial detention, before facing trial on 10 August 1934 at the recently established special “people’s court”, configured by the authorities to specialise in political prosecutions.   He was sentenced to a three year jail term, of which under the German system still in place he will have been deemed already to have served slightly more than a year by the time of his trial and conviction.    Johanna Melzer, described by this stage as “his former wife”, was also arrested in July 1933, but released later.   She was re-arrested in August 1934 and in 1935 convicted on a charge of high treason.   Her death sentence was subsequently commuted to a fifteen year jail term.

Later years 
During 1936 Walter Duddins completed his prison sentence and in November he was transferred to the Sachsenhausen labour camp near Berlin.    According to reports that emerged in East Germany after 1945, in or before 1939 he renounced the Communist party and was released from the camp in August 1939.      There is apparent inconsistency in the surviving reports of his final years.   Records of a statement provided to East German party leaders  by Johanna Melzer, who had lived with Duddins between 1925 and 1932, assert that Melzer’s own political development (towards communism and anti-Hitler activism) could in large part be credited to Duddins.   However, she also stated that at the start of August 1941, approximately six weeks after the launch of the German invasion of the Soviet Union, she had received a letter from Duddins who was writing from Königsberg.   In the letter Duddins had spelled out the reasons for the unexpected development, and written with great enthusiasm of the actions undertaken by the Hitler army and his own wish to apply his own efforts to supporting the anti-Soviet cause.   Melzer was reported, at this point, to have broken off all contact with Duddins.   A very different picture emerges from a report attributed to a trusted and respected  former Königsberg party official called Georg Spielmann.   Spielmann reported that in March 1945 Duddins had saved him from arrest by the Gestapo and/or the military police which would have been followed by a court martial.   Duddins had done this by making a false testimony under oath as to Spielmann presence with him in a machining department.   Relatively uncontested is Melzer’s statement that shortly after the Soviet invasion of 1945 Walter Duddins died of dysentery in a prisoner of war camp near Königsberg (renamed as Kaliningrad in 1946).

Notes

References 

1903 births
1945 deaths
People from Königsberg
Politicians from Dortmund
Communist Party of Germany politicians
Members of the Landtag of Prussia
People condemned by Nazi courts
Sachsenhausen concentration camp survivors
Deaths from dysentery